The following is a List of Saab passenger cars  indexed by year of introduction.

Model history

See also

List of automobiles

References

Saab